The 1992 presidential campaign of Bill Clinton, then the governor of Arkansas, was announced on October 3, 1991, at the Old State House in Little Rock, Arkansas. After winning a majority of delegates in the Democratic primaries of 1992, the campaign announced that then-junior Senator from Tennessee, Al Gore, would be Clinton's running mate. The Clinton-Gore ticket went on to defeat Republican incumbent President George H. W. Bush and Vice President Dan Quayle in the presidential election on November 3, 1992, and took office as the 42nd president and 45th vice president, respectively, on January 20, 1993.

Candidate background
Clinton was the governor of a traditionally conservative Southern state, Arkansas. He had been viewed as a viable presidential candidate before his actual bid in 1992. During the 1988 Democratic Party presidential primaries, where George H. W. Bush, the incumbent vice president, seemed all but inevitable as the president, many turned to Clinton as the next Southern leader of the party. Bill Clinton was seen as a potential candidate as he was a popular Democratic governor in a state that had voted for Republicans in four of the last five presidential elections. Breaking with the traditional left wing platform of the Democratic Party, Clinton espoused the ideas of the Third Way. A former chairman of the DLC, he ran as a New Democrat.

Timeline

Primaries
In the wake of President George H.W. Bush's sky-high approval ratings after Operation Desert Storm, American media gave the Democratic party little chance of winning the presidency in 1992. Early Democratic front-runners included Bill Bradley, a New Jersey senator; Jesse Jackson, who finished second in 1988; Dick Gephardt, a Missouri representative and then House Majority Leader; Al Gore, then a senator from Tennessee; and Jay Rockefeller, a senator from West Virginia. But each bowed out early; neither Bradley nor Rockefeller considered themselves ready to run, Gephardt seemed to accept Bush's re-election as a sure thing, and Gore had opted to spend more time with his family in the wake of a tragic accident that threatened the life of his young son. The most notable front-runner, Mario Cuomo, decided not to run on December 20, 1991, the final day to apply to run in the New Hampshire primary.

In the lead-in to the 1992 New Hampshire Democratic primary, the Clinton campaign was rocked by scandal when Gennifer Flowers accused Clinton of having a 12-year sexual affair. At the same time, Clinton was accused of misleading the U.S. Army Reserve to avoid service in the Vietnam War. Bill and Hillary Rodham Clinton addressed the sexual misconduct allegations in an interview by Steve Kroft on an episode of 60 Minutes aired after the Super Bowl XXVI. Although at that time the Clintons denied an affair, they admitted to have known Flowers and Bill admitted that he had caused problems in their marriage. Although Clinton lost to Paul Tsongas in the New Hampshire primary and suffered from persistent criticism over his character for the rest of the election, he won the Super Tuesday primaries. He ultimately secured the Democratic nomination after winning primaries in Illinois and Michigan, earning him the nickname "The Comeback Kid." At the same time, Bush's lead waned due to his administration's handling of the early 1990s recession and the 1992 Los Angeles riots.

Arsenio Hall Show appearance 
Clinton was a guest on The Arsenio Hall Show on Wednesday June 3, 1992, the day after he secured the Democratic Party nomination.  He played "Heartbreak Hotel" on the  saxophone.  The appearance is often considered an important moment in Clinton's political career, helping build his popularity amongst minority and young voters.  Clinton's appearance on the show and subsequent media coverage of it, catapulted him ahead of Bush in the polls.

Running mate selection

In June and July 1992, speculation grew about who Clinton was going to pick as his running mate. Possible candidates included Kerrey, Indiana congressman Lee Hamilton, Missouri congressman Dick Gephardt, Tennessee senator Al Gore, New Jersey senator Bill Bradley, Florida senator Bob Graham and Pennsylvania senator Harris Wofford. On July 9, 1992, Clinton selected Gore as his running mate in the Arkansas State Mansion at Little Rock.

Convention

During the 1992 Democratic Convention, the convention hall was plagued by the fact that independent candidate Ross Perot was tied with or beating Clinton in opinion research polls. This caused a moderate turn of events at the convention to win back Perot voters from the Perot campaign. This led to the selection of such speakers such as Representative Barbara Jordan from Texas to deliver a bipartisan keynote address to the convention delegates. Also speaking was the vice-presidential nominee Al Gore who appealed to the center as he was, at the time, a Southern moderate Democrat from Tennessee.

However, on the last day the convention convened on July 16, 1992, Ross Perot dropped out of the presidential race and left a gap for both Bush and Clinton to scramble for newly undecided voters. This greatly led to the advantage of Bill Clinton who gave his nomination acceptance speech that night.

Election night
Throughout election night, Clinton over performed in rural areas of the country such as in the mountain west, winning Montana, Colorado, and New Mexico (16 electoral votes). Clinton also won rural voters in the south and mid-west, carrying states such as Missouri, Arkansas, Tennessee, Kentucky, West Virginia, Louisiana, Georgia, and Iowa (57 electoral votes).

Campaign strategy

The Southern lock
A source of frustration for Democrats after the adoption of Richard Nixon's Southern strategy was the increasing Republican lock on the electoral votes of the Southern United States. Clinton's home of Arkansas gave Democrats hope that they could carry some Southern states and ultimately win the election. Clinton then made what even his opponents acknowledged was a master stroke by choosing Al Gore, a senator from Tennessee, as his running mate. This choice blunted a major strategy of the Bush campaign to paint Clinton and Gore as 'Northern liberals' in the mold of previous candidates George McGovern, Walter Mondale, Michael Dukakis, and, to a lesser extent, Hubert Humphrey. Additionally, Gore's prior military record removed much of the criticism Clinton had received earlier.

Besides Gore, several names were rumored to be in contention for the second spot, including Florida senator and former governor of Florida Bob Graham, Indiana congressman Lee H. Hamilton, Nebraska senator and former governor Bob Kerrey, Iowa senator Tom Harkin, and newly elected Pennsylvania senator Harris Wofford.

Courting white voters 
According to Princeton politics professor Paul Frymer, Clinton's campaign successfully exploited the "Democratic capture" of African American votes to the detriment of African Americans. Frymer argues that the open hostility of the Republican party towards minorities allowed Clinton to pursue the votes of white "Reagan Democrats" with sub-textually racist messages without losing support among the African American community.

One way in which Clinton courted white votes was by associating closely with the Democratic Leadership Council (DLC), an organization created by southern conservative Democrats with the intent to bring white voters back to the Democratic party after the failure of the Mondale campaign in 1984. To that end, the DLC adopted Republican positions on race-related issues like crime, welfare, and affirmative action. Clinton served as the DLC national chairman from 1990 to 1991, and he aligned his rhetoric closely with that of the DLC during his campaign. For example, he advocated to "end welfare as we know it" and failed to mention race at all in his campaign book Putting People First, except while denouncing racial quotas.

Clinton, while serving as governor of Arkansas, refused to pardon a brain-damaged black man on death row named Rickey Ray Rector who had been convicted of killing a police officer. This was a widely publicized event that may have been influenced by Clinton's desire to not be painted "soft on crime," as failed Democratic candidate Michael Dukakis had been by the notorious Willie Horton ad.

Clinton also visited the Stone Mountain Correctional Facility in Georgia shortly before Super Tuesday to promote his "tough on crime" message. The location of the prison, Stone Mountain, Georgia is notable for its ties to white supremacist movements. Stone Mountain was the birthplace of the second rendition of the KKK and was a "white supremacist mecca." It is home to Stone Mountain Park which features a massive monument to the Confederacy carved onto the face of Stone Mountain. Clinton's press conference at the prison was organized to have a group of inmates, mostly black, present in the background. The image of "white political leaders in business suits in front of subjugated black male prisoners in jumpsuits" conveyed a message summed up by another contender for the Democratic nomination, former California governor Jerry Brown: "Two white men and forty black prisoners, what's he saying? He's saying we got 'em under control, folks, don't worry."After the Los Angeles riots of 1992, Clinton attended a summit conference of Jesse Jackson's Rainbow Coalition. During Clinton's speech, Clinton strongly criticized Jackson, who was sitting next to Clinton, for hosting Sister Souljah at the event. Clinton claimed that the comments Sister Souljah made were anti-white. The shocking denunciation was carried extensively by the media and gave Clinton's campaign a boost at a time when he was trailing Bush and Perot. Mary Matalin, Bush's campaign director, called Clinton's speech "a stroke of genius" by dealing with "the Jesse Jackson factor" by "publicly humilat[ing] him."

President Bush's approval ratings
For most of 1991, the incumbent president, George H.W. Bush, was extremely popular after the Persian Gulf War, with approval rating at times reaching as high as 90 percent. That war had helped erase the Vietnam Syndrome America had felt since the 1960s, restoring confidence in the country's ability to assert itself militarily abroad. But because of a growing public perception of an economic downturn, Bush's popularity began falling throughout late 1991, and by February 1992, his approval rating fell below 40%. Bush's approval would stay low for the rest of the campaign season.

Reasons for victory
Clinton's charisma, combined with a talented campaign staff and skilled campaign strategy, led to victory. Organizational theorists have proposed that his campaign structure adopted an effective blend of informality with clear goal definition, which allowed for structured creativity. There was also the Ross Perot factor, as he took many votes from the angry base due to Bush's breaking of the no tax pledge. Bill Clinton also focused on the economy in 1992 due to the recession and ran on school choice, balanced budget amendment, opposition to illegal immigration and support for NAFTA.

See also

1992 Democratic Party presidential primaries
1992 Democratic Party vice presidential candidate selection
1992 Democratic National Convention
1992 United States presidential election
George H. W. Bush 1992 presidential campaign
Ross Perot 1992 presidential campaign

References

External links
Bill Clinton announcement speech
Bill Clinton acceptance speech
Booknotes interview with P.F. Bentley on Clinton: Portrait of Victory, January 17, 1993.

Bill Clinton
Al Gore
Clinton, Bill
Clinton, Bill